Stina Berg (21 October 1869 – 5 October 1930) was a Swedish silent film actress. She appeared in more than 40 films between 1912 and 1931.

Selected filmography
 Laughter and Tears (1913) directed by Victor Seastrom
 Children of the Streets (1914)
 Guilt Redeemed (1915)
 The Price of Betrayal (1915)
 Andersson's Kalle (1922)
 The Blizzard (1923) directed by Mauritz Stiller
 Her Little Majesty (1925)
 A Sister of Six (1926)
 Uncle Frans (1926)
 His English Wife (1927)
 The Queen of Pellagonia (1927)
 Sealed Lips (1927)
 Sin (1928)
 Jansson's Temptation (1928)
 Say It with Music (1929)
 Charlotte Löwensköld (1930)
 For Her Sake (1930)
 The People of Norrland (1930)
 Cavaliers of the Crown (1930)
 Colourful Pages (1931)

References

External links

1869 births
1930 deaths
Swedish film actresses
Swedish silent film actresses
Actresses from Stockholm
20th-century Swedish actresses